Matt Gunther is a New York-based advertising, editorial, documentary photographer, and director. He is best known the book 'Probable Cause'.

Career 
Gunther studied at LaGuardia High School in New York City and earned a Bachelor of Fine Arts degree from the State University of New York at Purchase.

Gunther was embedded with the Newark Police force for nearly a decade between 2002 and 2011. he was able to obtain access to  through his families connections to the department. Gunther was able to spend time in police precincts and go on drivealongs with officers.

The book was co-published by Schilt and Magical Thinking. Gunther He has shot celebrities such as Angelina Jolie.

References

External links 
 

Artists from New York (state)
American photographers
Living people
Year of birth missing (living people)